MensuHell is a Canadian comics fanzine published in Montréal in Québec from December 1999 to December 2008.

With 109 issues, MensuHell is probably the Québec comics fanzine which has the longest run.
The name MensuHell is a sound-alike portmanteau of the French word "mensuel" (monthly), and the English word "hell".

Description of the content
The content of the periodical publication MensuHell is principally made of original material of bandes dessinées, with some editorial texts and historical ones.

MensuHell has been steadily presenting an average of 40 pages of comics in every issue, alongside articles on Quebec comics by comics historians Michel Viau and Marc Jetté.

The contributors are from Canada and are mostly francophones. Some of the comics are published in English.

History
The founder of MensuHell is the comics artist Steve Requin who was also its former editor, but ownership has since been passed to the comics fan Francis Hervieux in 2002.

MensuHell was sold in Montréal and in Québec City, in specialized comics stores.

With 109 issues, MensuHell enjoys one of the longest run for a fanzine published in Quebec.

Contributors

Some of these artists work under a pseudonym.

Comics artists

The Québec comics artists are usually complete artists : they make the script, the pencils, the inks and the letters of their comics pages. It happens that they work with a writer.

See also
 Franco-Belgian comics
 Canadian comics
 Quebec comic strips

Sources
Michel Viau, BDQ, Répertoire des publications de bandes dessinées au Québec des origines à nos jours, éditions Mille-Îles, 1999 
Mira Falardeau, Histoire de la bande dessinée au Québec, VLB éditeur, 2008

External links
Official MensuHell website 

1999 comics debuts
1999 establishments in Quebec
2008 disestablishments in Quebec
Fanzines
Canadian comics titles
Defunct magazines published in Canada
French-language magazines published in Canada
Magazines established in 1999
Magazines disestablished in 2008
Magazines published in Montreal
Monthly magazines published in Canada